Kaj Valentin Turunen (born 27 December 1960 in Lohja) is a Finnish politician. Turunen was elected to the Finnish Parliament in the 2011 election as a The Finns Party candidate from the electoral district of Southern Savonia with 2,631 votes. In 2015, he won a seat in South-Eastern Finland.

On 13 June 2017, Turunen and 19 others left the Finns Party parliamentary group to found the New Alternative parliamentary group. In April 2018, he left the party to join the National Coalition Party.

Turunen has a professional education as a construction worker (1978, Jyväskylän ammattikoulu), and has further professional qualifications in entrepreneurship (2008) and leadership (2011), both from JAMK University of Applied Sciences.

References

1960 births
Living people
People from Lohja
Finns Party politicians
Blue Reform politicians
National Coalition Party politicians
Members of the Parliament of Finland (2011–15)
Members of the Parliament of Finland (2015–19)